The 1994 Las Vegas Bowl featured the UNLV Rebels and the Central Michigan Chippewas in a bowl rematch of a regular season game between the two teams.

Background
Central Michigan was in its first year under Dick Flynn, who lead them to a Mid-American Conference (MAC) championship. UNLV tied for second in the Big West Conference as they were making their second bowl game in ten years under first-year head coach Jeff Horton. This was a rematch of an earlier matchup the two teams had earlier in the season, which Central Michigan won, 35–23 at home.

Game summary
Henry Bailey had four touchdowns on the day for UNLV, three rushing and one passing, with 7 rushes for 79 yards and 5 catches for 101 yards to help win the game for UNLV, who had a 31–10 lead at halftime and led 52–10 after UNLV scored for the last time early in the fourth quarter. Ten touchdowns were scored on the day, seven by UNLV. Central Michigan had more turnovers (4) than touchdowns (3).

Aftermath
Flynn was fired in 1999 after five non-bowl seasons. The Chippewas didn't reach a bowl game again until 2006, the same year they won their next MAC title.

Horton was fired before UNLV would reach another bowl game, which they did under John Robinson, in 2000.

Statistics

References

Las Vegas Bowl
Las Vegas Bowl
Central Michigan Chippewas football bowl games
UNLV Rebels football bowl games
December 1994 sports events in the United States
Las